40 Years of Silence: An Indonesian Tragedy is a documentary film by anthropologist Robert Lemelson about the personal effects of the Indonesian mass killings of 1965-1966. The film was shot on the islands of Bali and Java from 2002–2006. The score is a collaboration between the British composer Malcolm Cross and the Balinese musician Nyoman Wenten, and combines Western tonalities and chordal structures with Balinese and Javanese scalar progressions and melodies. The film was released in the United States in 2009, and has had limited screenings throughout Indonesia.

Overview
An estimated 500,000 people were killed during a purge of suspected communists throughout Indonesia, in one of the largest mass-killings of the 20th century. General Suharto came to control of the Indonesian military and then the government following a failed coup d'état on September 30, 1965. 40 Years of Silence: An Indonesian Tragedy follows the testimonies of four individuals and their families from Central Java and Bali, two regions greatly affected by the purge. Each family discusses what it was like for survivors of the killings.  The film uses three historians (Romo Baskara Wardaya, Geoffrey Robinson, John Roosa) and anthropologist Robert Lemelson as the narrators, providing the historical setting for the families’ stories. These historical explanations are intercut with each character's narration of their experience of the killings and their aftermath. As the stories unfold, the film narrates the significant political, economic and cultural events underlying the massacres. The film describes aspects of how the extrajudicial killings were enacted, as well as what life under Suharto’s autocratic “New Order” regime was like for survivors, many of whom were stigmatized as family PKI communist party members. The film concludes with a demonstration of the beginnings of a more open period in Indonesia's history after the fall of the Suharto regime and the establishment of a period of democratization and reformation.

See also
The Act of Killing (2012)
The Look of Silence (2014)

References

External links
 
 
 
Reviews
 UCLA Today, 10 Questions for Robert Lemelson
 The Harvard Crimson, "Breaking from the 'Silence'"
 Jakarta Globe, "Breaking the 40-Year Silence About the Anti-Communist Purge"
 Voice of America Interview with Director Robert Lemelson
 Jakarta Globe, "1965 Mass Killings Erased From History, Scholars Say"
 Jakarta Globe, "1965: Giving Voice to the Silenced Past"

2009 documentary films
2009 films
American documentary films
Documentary films about the Indonesian mass killings of 1965–1966
Films directed by Robert Lemelson
2000s American films